William Trye (1660–1717), of Hardwicke, Gloucestershire, was an English politician.

He was a Member (MP) of the Parliament of England for Gloucester in 1690–1698 and 1702–1705.

References

1660 births
1717 deaths
People from Stroud District
Members of the Parliament of England (pre-1707) for Gloucester
English MPs 1702–1705